Marpissa (until 1926 Tsipidos) is a village in Paros, Greece. It is built on a hill at the east side of the island. It is located 19 kilometers away from Parikia, the capital of the island, and near the villages of Marmara and Prodromos. According to the 2011 census, it has 582 inhabitants. Marpissa has been characterised as a traditional settlement.

History 
On the west slopes of mount Profitis Ilias, near Marpissa, lies the cave of the Demons or Kalampaki. In the cave evidence of use from the late Neolithic and early Cycladic period, which correspond to fifth to third millennium BC, as well as findings dating from the late Cycladic and Mycenaean period. The findings include ceramics, like conical cups, seashells, animal bones and remains of fire. An ancient town known as Marpessa is mentioned in Paros, but its location remains unspecified.

Near Marpissa lies the hill of Kephalos, on top of which the Venetians built a castle, the third in the island after those in Parikia and Naousa. The construction of the castle, according to archaeological evidence, started in late 13th century. The castle was ready in the start of the 15th century, when it was mentioned by Cristoforo Buondelmonti (1415-1420). Furthemore, the inaugurational inscription at the church of Evaggelismos mentions 1410 as year of construction. The castle was expanded in circa 1500 by Niccolo Sommaripa, who moved the capital of the island from Parikia to Kephalos. Hayreddin Barbarossa sieged and conquered the castle in 1537.

Marpissa may have started developing during the second half of the 16th century, with the creation of a fortress-like settlement. Possibly, Marpissa, Marmara and Prodromos were created by the inhabitants of Kephalos castle and nearby hamlets. Marpissa and Marmara are mentioned in the Ottoman sources of late 17th century.

Places of interest 
Marpissa has been characterised as a traditional settlement, with many houses dating from the 17th and 18th century. In the central square of the village lie four windmills. The village is home of Perantinos Sculpture Museum and a Folklore Museum. On top Kastellos hill, at the location of the ruined castle, lies the monastery of Saint Antonios.

Traditions 
During the Holy Week in Marpissa takes place a reenactment of the Passion of Jesus.

References 

Paros
Villages in Greece